Hillary Scott  is an American former pornographic actress.

Career
Scott starred in the 2007 film Corruption which won seven AVN Awards, including Best Actress – Video. She replaced Jessica Sweet in the role of "Britney Rears" for the films Britney Rears 3: Britney Gets Shafted and Britney Rears 4: Britney Goes Gonzo.

Hillary Scott and Sex Z Pictures parted ways just a little over two years into a five-year exclusive performing / directing contract, and she was represented by LA Direct Models.

Awards
Scott holds the record for most XRCO Awards won by a performer in one night, winning Female Performer of the Year, Best Actress, Orgasmic Analist, Orgasmic Oralist and Superslut at the 2007 XRCO Awards show.

Other nominations

References

External links 

 
 
 

Year of birth missing (living people)
American pornographic film actresses
Living people
21st-century American actresses